Bagh-e-Jinnah, Karachi (formerly known as Frere Hall Gardens) is an urban park located between Abdullah Haroon Road (old name Victoria Road) and Fatima Jinnah Road (formerly Bonus Road) in Karachi, Pakistan.

It is also known by its old name Frere Hall Gardens and is spread over 15 acres. The park is famous for its Frere Hall, constructed in 1865. A public library and an art gallery "Sadequain Hall", named after Pakistan's iconic painter artist Sadequain, are also housed in this hall. Karachi citizens and visitors find it delightful in the evenings when they can enjoy the cool southwesterly sea breeze on its lawns.

History 
In the days of the British rule, it served as the main city hall of Karachi and was the center of Karachi's social and cultural activities. Frere Hall was first opened to the public in 1865. Its construction started in 1863 and was completed in 1865. Constructed in the Venetian Gothic architecture style with yellowish Karachi limestone and red and grey sandstones from the nearby Jungshahi area, Frere Hall was built in honor of Sir Henry Bartle Edward Frere, British Commissioner in Sindh, who was known for promoting economic development in the area of Sindh. In its vicinity are the Marriott Hotel, U.S. Consulate, the Japanese Consulate and the Sindh Club.

After independence of Pakistan in 1947, Bagh-e-Jinnah's large area and park grounds are frequently used for public gatherings by Pakistani political leaders.

See also 
 List of parks and gardens in Karachi

References

Gardens in Pakistan
Buildings and structures in Karachi
Tourist attractions in Karachi
Parks in Karachi
Memorials to Muhammad Ali Jinnah